Cults of Prax is a tabletop role-playing game supplement for RuneQuest. Originally published by Chaosium in 1979, it was republished in 2016 in PDF format as part of Chaosium's RuneQuest: Classic Edition Kickstarter.

Contents
Cults of Prax describes 15 cults and the gods they worship.

Publication history
Shannon Appelcline explained that "Though some of RuneQuest's first supplements were simple dungeon crawls and stat books, many others were groundbreaking. Cults of Prax (1979) and Cults of Terror (1981) gave precise details on the worship of a few dozen gods within the world of Glorantha, further delving into the depths of RuneQuest'''s sophisticated religions."

Reception
Steve Jackson reviewed Cults of Prax in The Space Gamer No. 27. Jackson commented that "Gods don't have to be effective to be important. Belief is the thing, and the interactions of social groups and differing beliefs in Cults of Prax is good fantasy reading even if you don't game at all."

Richard L. Snider reviewed Cults of Prax for Different Worlds magazine and stated that "I view the addition of social interaction mechanisms and a delineated cosmology to be integral to a complete fantasy campaign. Cult of Prax is the only published sourcebook of this type that gives these factors anywhere near their proper weight. I applaud both authors and the editors for their fine product."

O.C. Macdonald reviewed Cults of Prax for White Dwarf #23, giving it an overall rating of 10 out of 10, and stated that "For those who are interested in RuneQuest, I cannot rate this book too highly, it makes an excellent, imaginative and highly playable FRP system into a masterpieces that richly deserves a place at the forefront of the hobby."

In a retrospective review of Cults of Prax in Black Gate, Michael O'Brien said "Written by gaming legends Steve Perrin, co-author of the RuneQuest RPG rules, and the late Greg Stafford, creator of the fantasy setting Glorantha, Cults of Prax'''s ground-breaking presentation of gods and how they interact with the world through those who worship them still makes it one of the most influential and important works ever released for the RuneQuest RPG, and indeed for tabletop roleplaying games in general."

References

External links
 

Role-playing game supplements introduced in 1979
RuneQuest 2nd edition supplements